Lokomotiv Kharkov may refer to:

 FC Lokomotyv Kharkiv, football club
 MFC Lokomotyv Kharkiv, futsal club